Jamnik is a small settlement in the hills west of Vrhnika in the Inner Carniola region of Slovenia.

History
Jamnik became a separate settlement in 2002, when its territory was administratively separated from Zaplana.

References

External links
Jamnik on Geopedia

Populated places in the Municipality of Vrhnika